Yunder Nedim Beytula (Bulgarian: Юндер Бейтула; born 9 January 1992) is a Bulgarian male weightlifter.

Career

World Championships
In 2019 he competed at the 2019 World Weightlifting Championships in the 81 kg category, winning the bronze medal in the clean & jerk portion with 201 kg.

Major results

References

Living people
1992 births
Bulgarian male weightlifters
World Weightlifting Championships medalists
European Weightlifting Championships medalists
People from Dobrich
21st-century Bulgarian people